Chekhrak is a rural locality in the Mayskoye Rural Settlement of Koshekhablsky District, Adygea, Russia. The population was 10 as of 2018.

Geography 
Chekhrak is located on the Chokhrak River, 19 km south of Koshekhabl (the district's administrative centre) by road.

References 

Rural localities in Koshekhablsky District